Microsaccades are a kind of fixational eye movement. They are small, jerk-like, involuntary eye movements, similar to miniature versions of voluntary saccades.  They typically occur during prolonged visual fixation (of at least several seconds), not only in humans, but also in animals with foveal vision (primates, cats, dogs etc.). Microsaccade amplitudes vary from 2 to 120 arcminutes. The first empirical evidence for their existence was provided by Robert Darwin, the father of Charles Darwin.

Function

The role of microsaccades in visual perception has been a highly debated topic that is still largely unresolved. It has been proposed that microsaccades correct displacements in eye position produced by drifts, although non-corrective microsaccades also occur. Some work has suggested that microsaccades are directly correlated with the perception of illusory motion. Although microsaccades can enhance vision of fine spatial detail, they can also impair visual perception in that they are associated with saccadic suppression. Microsaccades are also believed to be important for preventing the retinal image from fading.

Microsaccades are tied to complex visual processing like reading. The specific timing pattern of microsaccades in humans changes during reading based on the structure of the word being read.

Experiments in neurophysiology from different laboratories showed that fixational eye movements, particularly microsaccades, strongly modulate the activity of neurons in the visual areas of the macaque brain. In the lateral geniculate nucleus (LGN) and the primary visual cortex (V1), microsaccades can move a
stationary stimulus in and out of a neuron's receptive field, thereby producing transient neural responses. Microsaccades might account for much of the response variability of neurons in visual area V1 of the awake monkey.

Current research in visual neuroscience and psychophysics is investigating how microsaccades relate to fixation correction, memory, control of binocular fixation disparity and attentional shifts.

Clinical application 

The assessment of microsaccades can help in the diagnosis of multiple neurological and ophthalmological conditions.

See also 
 Fixation (visual)
 Ocular tremor
 Saccade

References

Notes

Bibliography 

  R. H. S. Carpenter. Movements of the Eyes (Pion, London, 1988).
 Guerrasio, Lorenzo (2011). Subcortical Control of Visual Fixation. Dissertation, LMU München: Faculty of Medicine.
 

Eye
Vision